In formal language theory, a context-sensitive language is a language that can be defined by a context-sensitive grammar (and equivalently by a noncontracting grammar).  Context-sensitive is one of the four types of grammars in the Chomsky hierarchy.

Computational properties 

Computationally, a context-sensitive language is equivalent to a linear bounded nondeterministic Turing machine, also called a linear bounded automaton. This means that every formal language that can be decided by such a machine is a context-sensitive language, and every context-sensitive language can be decided by such a machine.

This set of languages is also known as NLINSPACE or NSPACE(O(n)), because they can be accepted using linear space on a non-deterministic Turing machine.  The class LINSPACE (or DSPACE(O(n))) is defined the same, except using a deterministic Turing machine.  Clearly LINSPACE is a subset of NLINSPACE, but it is not known whether LINSPACE=NLINSPACE.

Examples 

One of the simplest context-sensitive but not context-free languages is : the language of all strings consisting of  occurrences of the symbol "a", then  "b"'s, then  "c"'s (abc, etc.). A superset of this language, called the Bach language, is defined as the set of all strings where "a", "b" and "c" (or any other set of three symbols) occurs equally often (etc.) and is also context-sensitive.

 can be shown to be a context-sensitive language by constructing a linear bounded automaton which accepts .

Similarly:
 
 is another context-sensitive language; the corresponding context-sensitive grammar can be easily projected starting with two context-free grammars generating sentential forms in the formats

and

and then supplementing them with a permutation production like 
, a new starting symbol and standard syntactic sugar.

 is another context-sensitive language (the "3" in the name of this language is intended to mean a ternary alphabet); that is, the "product" operation defines a context-sensitive language (but the "sum" defines only a context-free language as the grammar  and  shows). This problem can be avoided considering a somehow more restrictive definition of the language, e.g. . This can be specialized to 

 is a context-sensitive language.

 is a context-sensitive language.

 is a context-sensitive language (the "2" in the name of this language is intended to mean a binary alphabet). This was proved by Hartmanis using pumping lemmas for regular and context-free languages over a binary alphabet and, after that, sketching a linear bounded multitape automaton accepting .

 is a context-sensitive language (the "1" in the name of this language is intended to mean an unary alphabet). This was credited by A. Salomaa to Matti Soittola by means of a linear bounded automaton over an unary alphabet (pages 213-214, exercise 6.8) and also to Marti Penttonen by means of a context-sensitive grammar also over an unary alphabet (See: Formal Languages by A. Salomaa, page 14, Example 2.5).

An example of recursive language that is not context-sensitive is any recursive language whose decision is an EXPSPACE-hard problem, say, the set of pairs of equivalent regular expressions with exponentiation.

Properties of context-sensitive languages 

 The union, intersection, concatenation of two context-sensitive languages is context-sensitive, also the Kleene plus of a context-sensitive language is context-sensitive.
 The complement of a context-sensitive language is itself context-sensitive a result known as the Immerman–Szelepcsényi theorem.
 Membership of a string in a language defined by an arbitrary context-sensitive grammar, or by an arbitrary deterministic context-sensitive grammar, is a PSPACE-complete problem.

See also
 Linear bounded automaton
 List of parser generators for context-sensitive languages
 Chomsky hierarchy
 Indexed languages – a strict subset of the context-sensitive languages
 Weir hierarchy

References

 Sipser, M. (1996), Introduction to the Theory of Computation, PWS Publishing Co.

Formal languages